Jeff Hand (born July 26, 1970) is an American football coach.  He has served the head football coach at Westminster College in New Wilmington, Pennsylvania, a position he held from the 2005 through his resignation at the end of the 2013 season. Hand served as the head football coach at Benedictine University from 1999 to 2000 and at Waynesburg University from 2001 to 2004.  A native of Ellwood City, Pennsylvania, he graduated from Clarion University of Pennsylvania in 1992.

Head coaching record

College

References

1970 births
Living people
Benedictine Eagles football coaches
Hanover Panthers football coaches
Waynesburg Yellow Jackets football coaches
Westminster Titans football coaches
Clarion University of Pennsylvania alumni
People from Ellwood City, Pennsylvania
American expatriate sportspeople in France
American expatriate sportspeople in Brazil